Atkinson Cliffs are high coastal cliffs,  long, between the lower ends of Fendley Glacier and Pitkevitch Glacier on the north coast of Victoria Land, Antarctica. They were mapped in 1911 by the Northern Party of the British Antarctic Expedition, 1910–13, and named for Dr. Edward L. Atkinson, surgeon of the expedition. The cliffs lie on the Pennell Coast, a portion of Antarctica lying between Cape Williams and Cape Adare.

References
 

Cliffs of Victoria Land
Pennell Coast